Luka Čermelj (born 29 July 1995) is a Serbian professional footballer who plays as a defensive midfielder for Sogdiana Jizzakh. He is the son of former footballer Miroslav Čermelj and the older brother of footballer Filip Čermelj.

References

External links
 

Association football midfielders
FK Sinđelić Beograd players
FK Teleoptik players
FK Radnički Niš players
FK Inđija players
Footballers from Belgrade
Serbian First League players
Serbian SuperLiga players
Serbian footballers
1995 births
Living people